Climbing is the human activity of ascending a steep object with the hands and/or feet.

Climbing, Climb or The climb may also refer to:

Apparel and equipment
Climbing harness
Climbing rope
Climbing shoe
Climbing wall, an artificially constructed wall with grips for hands and feet, usually used for indoor climbing or lead climbing
Rock-climbing equipment

Arts, entertainment, and media

Films
The Climb (1986 film), a drama film starring Bruce Greenwood
The Climb (1999 film), a drama film starring John Hurt
The Climb (2002 film), an action film starring Jason George
The Climb (2007 film), a documentary film starring Laurie Skreslet
The Climb (2017 film), a French adventure comedy film adapting the story of Nadir Dendoune
The Climb (2019 film), an American comedy-drama film

Music
Climb, a Canadian AOR group
Climbing!, a 1970 album by Mountain
"Climbing", by the Meat Puppets from Meat Puppets II
"The Climb" (song), a 2009 song by Miley Cyrus from the soundtrack of Hannah Montana: The Movie
"The Climb", a song by The Coasters
"The Climb", a 1964 song by The Kingsmen
"The Climb", a song by No Doubt from the album Tragic Kingdom (1995)

Television
"Climbing", an episode of the television series Zoboomafoo
"The Climb" (Arrow), season 3 episode 9 of The CW's Arrow
"The Climb" (Game of Thrones), season 3 episode 6 of HBO's Game of Thrones

Other uses in arts, entertainment, and media
Climbing (magazine)
The Climb (book), a 1996 non-fiction book by Anatoli Boukreev and G. Weston DeWalt
The Climb (video game) is a video game in virtual reality, that requires players to climb game environments
The Climb 2, a sequel to The Climb

Biology
Arboreal locomotion, animal locomotion while on trees, rocks, mountains, or cliffs
Climbing salamander
Climbing shell vine
Climbing shield fern
Climbing shrew
Climbing swamp mouse
Climbing vine, any plant with a growth habit of trailing or scandent (that is, climbing) stems, lianas or runners

Sports
Climbing (sport), or sport climbing
Free climbing
Indoor climbing
Lead climbing
Mountain-climbing
Rock climbing
Solo climbing
Traditional climbing
Climbing competition
Climbing specialist, a racing cyclist who is especially competitive on hills

Other uses
Climb (aeronautics), an aviation term
Step climb
Top of climb
Dislocation climb, a materials science term
Social climbing

See also
Climber (disambiguation)
Limb (disambiguation)